Grapevine virus B is plant virus species in the genus Vitivirus. It is associated with rugose wood (corky bark) symptoms in grapevine.

See also 
 List of viruses
 List of grape diseases

References

External links 
 ICTV Virus Taxonomy 2009
 UniProt Taxonomy

Betaflexiviridae
Viral grape diseases